Richard de Pontefract O. P. (fl. 1320) was an English Dominican friar active during the reign King Edward II. On 25 June 1320, King Edward petitioned the papacy for Richard to fill the see of Dunblane, vacant by the death of Nicholas de Balmyle. Although King Edward probably did not expect to have much luck, because of the circumstances of Wars of Scottish Independence, Edward claimed the right of patronage to Scottish sees. The vacant bishopric was eventually filled by Maurice, the Abbot of Inchaffray.

References

 
 
 

13th-century births
14th-century deaths
English Dominicans
14th-century English Roman Catholic priests
English people of the Wars of Scottish Independence